This article lists the prime ministers of Rwanda since the formation of the post in 1961 (during the Rwandan Revolution), to the present day.

The prime minister of Rwanda is the head of government of the Republic of Rwanda. The prime minister is appointed by the president, along with other ministers in the Cabinet.

A total of 11 people have served in the office. The incumbent prime minister is Édouard Ngirente, who took office on 30 August 2017.

Key
Political parties

Other factions

List of officeholders

Timeline

See also

 Politics of Rwanda
 List of kings of Rwanda
 List of presidents of Rwanda
 Vice President of Rwanda
 List of colonial governors of Ruanda-Urundi
 List of colonial residents of Rwanda

Notes

References

External links
World Statesmen – Rwanda

Rwanda
 
Government of Rwanda
1961 establishments in Rwanda
Prime Ministers
Prime Ministers